Hjortkvarn is a locality situated in Hallsberg Municipality, Örebro County, Sweden with 238 inhabitants in 2010. It is near the demographical center of Sweden.

In 2007, Hjortkvarn was named Sweden's demographical centre.

References 

Populated places in Örebro County
Populated places in Hallsberg Municipality